Armillo is a 3D puzzle-platform game developed by Fuzzy Wuzzy Games. It was released on July 3, 2014, for the Wii U on the Nintendo eShop. A Windows port was released on July 3, 2020.

Gameplay 

Armillo is an action platform game in which the playable character, an armadillo named Armillo, rolls around a 3D space. He can perform three primary actions: roll, jump, and boost. The game is designed around the concept of an obstacle course, so the player is constantly being presented to various new puzzles, mechanics, and challenges.

Gameplay has been likened to other games such as the Sonic the Hedgehog series, Super Mario Galaxy, and the Super Monkey Ball series. Players primarily progress through levels by rolling Armillo and have the option to utilize the tilt controls of the Wii U's GamePad to do so. Armillo is aided in his quest through special abilities and power-ups such as a size boost and the Critter gun which fires the non-playable Critters at Armillo's enemies.

While the majority of the game takes place in a 3D world, there are unlockable 2D bonus stages in every single non-boss level. Purchasable upgrades, obtained using blue orbs collected in levels, also enable optional backtracking of previously completed levels.

Development 

Armillo was developed by Fuzzy Wuzzy Games for the Wii U and is distributed on the Nintendo eShop. The game was originally planned to be a timed exclusive, and was scheduled to be released on other platforms within a few months of release, but this fell through. The decision was made in honor of Nintendo's recent support for independent developers.

The game was released on Steam for free in July 2020 with the option to support the developers for $3.99.

Reception 

Armillo received mixed reviews since its release. It holds an aggregate score of 79% at GameRankings and 72 at Metacritic, the latter of which indicates mixed or average reviews.

References

External links 
 

2014 video games
Puzzle-platform games
Video games developed in Canada
Wii U eShop games
Indie video games
Wii U games
Single-player video games
Windows games